Wu may refer to:

States and regions on modern China's territory
Wu (state), a kingdom during the Spring and Autumn Period 771–476 BCE
 Suzhou or Wu, its eponymous capital
 Wu County, a former county in Suzhou
 Eastern Wu or Sun Wu, one of the Three Kingdoms in 184/220–280 CE
 Li Zitong (died 622), who declared a brief Wu Dynasty during the Sui–Tang interregnum in 619–620 CE
 Wu (Ten Kingdoms), one of the ten kingdoms during the Five Dynasties and Ten Kingdoms Period 907–960 CE
 Wuyue, another of the ten kingdoms during the Five Dynasties and Ten Kingdoms Period 907–960 CE
 Wu (region), a region roughly corresponding to the territory of Wuyue
 Wu Chinese, a subgroup of Chinese languages now spoken in the Wu region
 Wuyue culture, a regional Chinese culture in the Wu region

Language
 Wu Chinese, a group of Sinitic languages that includes Shanghaiese

People
 Wu (surname) (or Woo), several different Chinese surnames
Chinese rulers
 Emperor Wu (disambiguation)
 King Wu (disambiguation)
 Duke Wu (disambiguation)
 Wu Zetian (624–705), also known as Empress Wu
 Wu, nickname of the singer of alternative rock band This Et Al

Religion
 Wu (awareness), a concept of awareness, consciousness or enlightenment in the Chinese folk religion
 Wú (negative), Zhaozhou's response to the question: "Does a dog have the Buddha-nature?"
 Wu (shaman), shaman in Chinese folk religion

Characters
 "Doctor Wu", a song on the 1975 album Katy Lied by the band Steely Dan
 Mr. Wu (1919 film), a 1919 British drama film based on the 1913 play
 Mr. Wu (1927 film), a 1927 American silent movie starring Lon Chaney
 Mr. Wu, a character referred to in several songs of the 1930s and 1940s by George Formby
 Mr. Wu, a character from the HBO TV series Deadwood
 Sensei Wu, a character in the animated TV series Ninjago
 Sgt. Wu, a character from the TV series Grimm
 Marcy Wu, a character from the TV series Amphibia
 Madame Wu, a character in the Simpsons episode "Goo Goo Gai Pan"

See also 
 Woo (disambiguation)
 WU (disambiguation)